LXRA may refer to:

Level Crossing Removal Authority - statutory authority in Victoria, Australia
Liver X receptor alpha - a nuclear receptor protein in humans